Bernard de Soissons was a French gothic architect, who participated at building of the west front of Reims Cathedral. He worked in Reims between the 1250s and the 1290s.

External links

References 

Gothic architects
13th-century French architects